Below is a list of villages and neighbourhoods in the Cook Islands. There are no cities in the Cook Islands. 

 Amuri, Cook Islands
 Arutanga 
 Avarua (national capital, with international airport: Rarotonga International Airport)  
 Avatiu 
 Omoka 
 Oneroa, Cook Islands